Planeta or El Planeta means (the) planet in multiple languages. It may refer to:

Film, TV and publications
 El Planeta, a Boston-based Spanish language newspaper
El Planeta (Ecuador), an Ecuadorian newspaper, see List of newspapers in Ecuador
El Planeta (film), a 2021 film directed by Amalia Ulman
 Moya Planeta, a Russian television channel
 Planeta Group, a Spanish media group based in Madrid
 Planeta DeAgostini, a subsidiary of Grupo Planeta specializing in collectable books
 Planeta.ru, a Russian crowdfunding site
 Planeta TV, a Bulgarian music television channel
 Premio Planeta de Novela, a Spanish literary prize
 RTR-Planeta, the international service of the Russian broadcaster VGTRK

Music
El Planeta, an album by London-based theatre music band Von Magnet

El Planeta Imaginario, an album by La Oreja de Van Gogh 
 "Planeta Água", a song by Guilherme Arantes
 Planeta Azul, an album by Ruth Lorenzo
 Planeta Eskoria, an album by the Spanish band Ska-P
 Planeta Kumbia, an album by A.B. Quintanilla y Los Kumbia All Starz
 Planeta Paulina, an album by Paulina Rubio

Other uses
"El Planeta", aka Antonio Fernández, the first famous performer of cante flamenco (flamenco singing)
 Lingwa de planeta, a constructed international auxiliary language
 Planeta (surname)

See also
Casseta & Planeta, a Brazilian group of comedians
Deuterocopus planeta, a moth of the family Pterophoridae
 Ensemble Planeta, a Japanese all-female a cappella group
 Los Planetas, a Spanish indie group
 Pan Planeta, an album by Polish rock band Ścianka
 Planeta Bur, a 1962 Soviet science fiction film
 Planeta Rica, a town and municipality in Colombia
 Planeta U, an American children's program 
 Planeta Xuxa, a defunct television program in Brazil